Friedrich Carl Lehmann (27 November 1850 – 23 November 1903) was a German Consul to Colombia, mining engineer, amateur botanist and mycologist, and botanical collector.

Career
Lehmann conducted explorations in search of specimens of flora in the countries of Ecuador and Colombia over three decades, sending collected material to herbaria in Berlin-Dahlem, Kew, and Saint Petersburg. In 1903 he led an expedition to Popayán, Colombia, and passed through most of the provinces of Ecuador, in a search for orchids.

Family
Lehmann's grandson, Federico Carlos Lehmann Valencia (1914–1974), was a Colombian ornithologist.

Legacy
Friedrich Carl Lehmann is commemorated in the scientific name of a species of snake, Atractus lehmanni, which is endemic to Colombia and Ecuador.
Also, in 1895, botanist Ernest Friedrich Gilg published a genus of flowering plants from Columbia and Peru (belonging to the family Gentianaceae) as Lehmanniella in his honour.

References

External links
 Cribb, Phillip (2010). "The orchid collections and illustrations of Consul Friedrich C. Lehmann". Lankesteriana 10 (2-3): 1-215.

1850 births
1903 deaths
Orchidologists
19th-century German botanists
German expatriates in Colombia